Jucati is a city located in the state of Pernambuco, Brazil. Located  at 217 km away from Recife, capital of the state of Pernambuco. Has an estimated (IBGE 2020) population of 11,485 inhabitants.

Geography
 State - Pernambuco
 Region - Agreste Pernambucano
 Boundaries - São Bento do Una   (N);  Garanhuns and São João   (S);   Jupi  (E);    Capoeiras   (W)
 Area - 120.65 km2
 Elevation - 820 m
 Hydrography - Una and Mundaú rivers
 Vegetation - Caatinga Hiperxerófila
 Clima - Hot and Humid
 Annual average temperature - 20.8 c
 Distance to Recife - 217.6 km

Economy
The main economic activities in Jucati are based in food & beverage industry, commerce  and agribusiness, especially manioc, beans; and livestock such as cattle and poultry.

Economic indicators

Economy by Sector
2006

Health indicators

References

Municipalities in Pernambuco